Meddle is a 1971 album by Pink Floyd.

Meddle may also refer to:
"Meddle" (song), a song by Little Boots
"Meddle", a song by Boston Spaceships from Zero to 99

See also
Medal (disambiguation)
Metal (disambiguation)
Mettle (disambiguation)